The Triadex Muse is a sequencer-based synthesizer, produced in 1972, and designed by Edward Fredkin and Marvin Minsky at MIT.

Description
The Triadex Muse is an algorithmic, deterministic event generator, utilizing early digital integrated circuits to generate an audio output that can sound very musical.  It produces a sequence of notes based on the settings of about a dozen different parameters, including four small sliders that control Volume, Tempo, Pitch, and Fine Pitch. Only a few hundred were ever made.

The Muse was a featured exhibit for years at the Museum of Science, Boston. The exhibit signage explained the device's algorithmic approach to the creation of its seemingly random music.  Far from being random, its preset "song" played continuously—and was even given a name, "Museum Musings", by the staff.

The Muse is the subject of U. S. Patent 3610801.

Notable users

The device was known to be used by the first wave of electronic musicians in the Philadelphia area in the late 70s.  Users included: Charles Cohen,  Lenny Seidman, Jeff Caine, George Kuetemeyer, Eddie Jobson, Rex X Ray and Stephan Spera, Paul Wozniki, and the groups Heavenside Layer, Ghostwriters, Watersports, and The Orchestra of Philadelphia Electronic Musicians.

The Muse was also used during the WXPN radio show Star's End by host Gino Wong in the fall of 1977.

During her time as a fellow at the MIT Center for Advanced Visual Studies, Maryanne Amacher famously composed much of her "eartone" music using a Muse given to her by Marvin Minsky.

Morgan Fisher, a British avant-garde musician/composer  based in Tokyo, currently owns two Muses and has programmed them to "perform"  together in harmony (using Molex sync cables) during his improvisational concerts.

Eddie Jobson used a Muse to create the sequenced effects on “Alaska” by UK.

References

External links
Entry in the Synthmuseum
Muse Simulator for Windows
Article in RPM (magazine) November 7, 1970 (page 26)

Electronic musical instruments